The United Arab Emirates cricket team toured the Netherlands in August 2019 to play four Twenty20 International (T20I) matches. The fixtures were part of both teams' preparations for the 2019 ICC T20 World Cup Qualifier tournament. For the series, the United Arab Emirates recalled the majority of their squad from the 2019 Global T20 Canada tournament, while the Dutch team chose not to recall their players from Canada, or from the 2019 County Championship in England. The United Arab Emirates won the series 4–0.

Squads

T20I series

1st T20I

2nd T20I

3rd T20I

4th T20I

Notes

References

External links
 Series home at ESPN Cricinfo

2019 in Emirati cricket
2019 in Dutch cricket
International cricket competitions in 2019
International cricket tours of the Netherlands